Tunku Shazuddin Ariff ibni Al-Aminul Karim Sultan Sallehuddin (born 27 April 1970) is the current Tunku Mahkota (Deputy Crown Prince) of Kedah.

Biography
Tunku Shazuddin Ariff was born on 27 April 1970 in Alor Setar, Kedah. He is the youngest son of Sultan Sallehuddin ibni Sultan Badlishah and Sultanah Maliha binti Tengku Ariff. Sultan Sallehuddin ibni Sultan Badlishah was the seventh son of the Sultan of Kedah, Sultan Badlishah and Sultanah Asma, the Sultanah of Kedah. Tunku Shazuddin has one elder brother, Tengku Sarafudin Badlishah, who is the current Raja Muda (Crown Prince) of Kedah.

He received his early education at Sekolah Rendah Sri Petaling from 1977 to 1982 and his secondary education at Sekolah Menengah Bukit Bintang from 1982 to 1987. He later continued with his studies at KDU University College from 1989 to 1990. He attended Kansas Wesleyan University from 1990 to 1994 and graduated with a major in design and marketing.

Tunku Laksamana of Kedah
Tunku Shazuddin previously became the Tunku Laksamana of Kedah on 26 November 2017 before being proclaimed as the Tunku Mahkota of Kedah.

Tunku Mahkota of Kedah
Tunku Shazuddin was proclaimed as the Tunku Mahkota of Kedah on 19 June 2022.

Personal life
Tunku Shazuddin married to a commoner Che Puan Nur Julie Ariff (née Julie Gwee Chai Hong) on 26 November 2022. On the same day, Tunku Shazuddin's father, Al-Aminul Karim Sultan Sallehuddin Ibni Almarhum Sultan Badlishah bestowed Che Puan Nur Julie Ariff with the royal title of Tunku Puan Mahkota of Kedah (equivalent to the Deputy Crown Princess).

Honours
  :
 Grand Commander of the Order of Loyalty to Sultan Sallehuddin (SSSK) – Dato' Seri Diraja (25 August 2019)
 Knight Companion of the Order of Loyalty to the Royal House of Kedah (DSDK) – Dato' (19 January 2014)

Ancestry

References

Royal House of Kedah
1970 births
Living people
People from Kedah
Malaysian Muslims
Malaysian people of Malay descent
Sons of monarchs